Peter Klaunzer (born 9 December 1967) is a Liechtensteiner association football player. He is now retired.

Career
Klaunzer played as a midfielder for USV Eschen/Mauren from 1993 to 1997. He was also a member of the Liechtenstein national football team from 1990 to 1997, where he had a total of 18 caps.

References

1967 births
Living people
Liechtenstein footballers
Liechtenstein international footballers
Association football midfielders